Goshen Township is located in Stark County, Illinois. As of the 2010 census, its population was 686 and it contained 318 housing units.

History
Goshen Township is named after Goshen, Tuscarawas County, Ohio.

Geography

Demographics

References

External links
City-data.com
Illinois State Archives

Townships in Stark County, Illinois
Townships in Illinois